This is a list of vice-chancellors of the University of Wales, Trinity Saint David and its previous founding institutions.

The institution has changed its title three times in its history, from St David's College to St David's University College in 1971, then to the University of Wales, Lampeter in 1996, and more recently to the University of Wales, Trinity Saint David—a merging of University of Wales, Lampeter and Trinity University College, Carmarthen—in 2010; the names are split up into these categories.

Principals of St David's College
1827 Llewelyn Lewellin (1798–1878)
1879 Francis John Jayne (1845–1921) (Also Bishop of Chester)
1886 Herbert Edward Ryle (1856–1925) (Also Bishop of Exeter and Winchester) 
1888 Charles Gresford Edmondes (1838–1893)
1892 John Owen (1854–1926) (Also Bishop of Saint David's) 
1897 George William Gent (1852–1898) 
1898 Llewellyn John Montfort Bebb (1862–1915)
1916 Gilbert Cunningham Joyce (1866–1942) (Also Bishop of Monmouth) 
1923 Maurice Jones (1863–1957)
1938 Henry Kingsley Archdall (1886–1976)
1953 John Roland Lloyd Thomas (1908–1984)

Principals of St David's University College
1971 John Roland Lloyd Thomas (1908–1984)
1975 Brinley Rees (1919–2004)
1980 Brian Robert Morris, Baron Morris of Castle Morris (1930–2001)
1992 Keith Robbins (1940–2019)

Vice-chancellors of the University of Wales, Lampeter
1996 Keith Robbins (1940–2019)
2003 Robert A Pearce (1951–)
2008 Alfred Morris (1941–)
2009 Medwin Hughes (Also of Trinity University College, Carmarthen)

Vice-chancellors of the University of Wales, Trinity Saint David
2010 Medwin Hughes

University of Wales, Lampeter
University of Wales Trinity Saint David
Vice-Chancellors by university in Wales
Wales
Wales